The 2016 Liga Nacional de Fútbol de Puerto Rico would have been the 8th season of Puerto Rico's top-division football league.

The 2016 season was cancelled. The final of the 2016 Copa Luis Villarejo served as the qualifier for the 2017 CFU Club Championship.

Liga Nacional de Fútbol de Puerto Rico
1